Derek Yach (born 21 November 1955) was the president of the Philip Morris International-funded Foundation for a Smoke-Free World. He is a former employee of the World Health Organization and of PepsiCo.

Education
He received his MBChB from the University of Cape Town in 1979 and his MPH from Johns Hopkins School of Public Health in 1985. In 2007, he received an honorary DSc from Georgetown University.

Career
Yach was Chief Health Officer of the Vitality Group and the Executive Director of the Vitality Institute. At the WHO, Yach served under Director-General Gro Harlem Brundtland, as a cabinet director where he worked on the WHO Framework Convention on Tobacco Control and the Global Strategy on Diet and Physical Activity. Yach worked temporarily at the Rockefeller Foundation and served as SVP for Global Health and Agriculture Policy at PepsiCo (2007–13)

Foundation for a Smoke-Free World

Yach helped establish the Foundation for a Smoke-Free World in September 2017 with funding of USD 80 million annually for 12 years pledged by the tobacco industry Philip Morris International, “to accelerate global efforts to reduce health impacts and deaths from smoking, with the goal of ultimately eliminating smoking worldwide. Departed 25 Oct 2021

Memberships and associations

Yach serves on several advisory boards, including the NIH’s John E. Fogarty International Center. He serves on the Board of Directors of Cornerstone Capital Group, a sustainable finance-focused investment advisory firm founded by Erika Karp.

References

PepsiCo people
South African businesspeople
World Health Organization officials
Living people
1955 births
South African officials of the United Nations